Amblyrhynchichthys is a small genus of cyprinid fish containing only two Southeast Asian species.

Species
 Amblyrhynchichthys micracanthus H. H. Ng & Kottelat, 2004
 Amblyrhynchichthys truncatus (Bleeker, 1851)

References

 

Cyprinidae genera
Fish of Asia